Gu Zihao (born 13 March 1998) is a Chinese professional go player.

Gu Zihao was born in Xiantao, Hubei in 1998. He began to play go when he was 6 years old. To further study go, he moved to Wuhan at age 9, and then to Beijing at age 11. He earned professional 1 dan rank in 2010, when he was 12. He began participating in the Chinese A League in 2012. In 2015, he won China's National Go Individual tournament, and the Limin Cup, an under-20 international tournament.

He won an international title at the Samsung Cup in 2017, defeating Tang Weixing in the finals. Gu, who was 5 dan at the time, was promoted to 9 dan for the victory.

He won two domestic competitions in 2018, the Weifu Fangkai Cup and the Ahan Tongshan Cup, as well as the China-Japan Agon Cup playoff. In January 2020, while visiting family in his hometown Xiantao, he fell under the COVID-19 lockdown in Hubei; he continued to compete remotely while staying there until April. He won the CCTV Cup later that year, followed by several championships in 2021: the Tianyuan, the Ahan Tongshan Cup and China–Japan playoff, and the Longxing.

Gu is sometimes nicknamed èbà 'evil tyrant', derived from a username which he used for playing go online, Yìnchéng zhī bà 'Indianapolis tyrant'. He originally chose the username because he was a fan of the Indiana Pacers in the NBA.

Titles
International:
Limin Cup 2015 (under-20 tournament)
Samsung Cup 2017
China-Japan Agon Cup 2018 and 2021
Chinese:
National Go Individual 2015
Weifu Fangkai Cup 2018
Ahan Tongshan Cup 2018 and 2021
CCTV Cup 2020
Tianyuan 2021
Longxing 2021

References

1998 births
Living people
Chinese Go players
Sportspeople from Hubei